is a Japanese professional baseball outfielder for the Hanshin Tigers in Japan's Nippon Professional Baseball.

Early Baseball Career
A native of Nagasaki, Taiga started playing softball in 2nd grade all the way to junior high school. He joined Kaisei High School's baseball club but his team never made it to Koshien.

Upon entering Komazawa University, he participated in the Tohto University League games as an outfielder, and won the League Best Nine Award thrice. Together with current Tigers teammate Ryutaro Umeno, they played in the 2013 Japan-USA University Baseball Championship, where Japan won the 5-game series 3-2. In the autumn of his senior year, he batted 0.357 and led his team to its first league championship since 2001. He recorded a total of 11 home runs in his university career.

Hanshin Tigers
He was the Tiger's 3rd pick in the 2014 Nippon Professional Baseball draft. On November 26, he signed a contract for an annual salary of 10 million yen, plus a signing bonus of 60 million. He was assigned the jersey number 25, formerly owned by his Komadai senior, Takahiro Arai (now with the Hiroshima Carps).

2015

During the February spring camp in Okinawa, he showed early promise by hitting relatively well during batting practice sessions and intra-squad games. He even went 4-for-5 during a practice game with the KBO's Samsung Lions. He continued his productive streak, and eventually made it to the starting roster for the pre-season exhibition games. On March 4, he hit a 2-run homerun off Softbank's Kenji Otonari, and became the first Hanshin rookie to hit a home run in an exhibition game since Takashi Toritani in 2004. Fellow rookie Tsuyoshi Ishizaki also recorded the win that day, making them the first Hanshin rookies to record a victory and homerun in an exhibition game since Masashi Fujiwara and Akinobu Okada in 1980. He batted .267 in all of his exhibition game appearances, and earned himself a spot in the main squad's opening day roster. He decided to skip his university graduation ceremonies in order to attend the season opener, and witnessed the Tigers notch their first victory for the season, and first opening day walk-off win in 74 years.

He first appeared as a pinch hitter on the 7th inning of the April 2 match against the Swallows, where he got hit by a wild pitch by Tetsuya Yamamoto. He made it to the starting line up 3 days later, but still failed to record a hit. His first hit came from Baystar's Shoichi Ino on April 8, but he again went hitless on his next start which prompted management to take him off the active roster on April 13. Despite the demotion, he got his rhythm back in the farm games and was once again called up to the main squad on the 23rd. On his next start, he cracked a 3-run home run off Swallow's Yoshihisa Naruse on his first at-bat. The home run - his first official one, helped Hanshin take two straight wins during an early season slump. “My first hit came at Koshien and I wanted to get my first home run at Koshien too,” he said, as he recalled connecting on Naruse’s 0-1 slider on a drive to left-center. “I swung at the first pitch but was a little tight, so I relaxed and had a nice compact swing on the second pitch.”

On July 24, he homered in his second straight game and became the first rookie in franchise history to accomplish the feat since Akinobu Okada in 1980. Two days later, he notched his first career modasho(3 hits in a game) against Yokohama and became the first rookie to accomplish the feat since Shunsuke Fujikawa in 2010.

Playing Style
During his university years, Egoshi was known for his slugging power and speed (5.8 seconds for a 50-meter dash). His throwing arm can also be relied upon for defense in the outfield. Eventually, he became known as the triple three right-handed slugger (batted above 30%, hit 30 homers since high school, and stole 30 bases).

References

External links

NPB statistics

1993 births
Living people
Baseball people from Nagasaki Prefecture
Komazawa University alumni
Japanese baseball players
Hanshin Tigers players
Hokkaido Nippon-Ham Fighters players
Nippon Professional Baseball outfielders